Jason Robinson (born October 1980) is a Professor of Materials Physics in the Department of Materials Science and Metallurgy, University of Cambridge, and Fellow of St John's College, Cambridge. Currently, his main research interests are in the areas of superconducting spintronics and interface coupling of materials with radically different properties. Particular topics include the superconductor proximity effect, Josephson junctions with magnetic barriers, spintronics, and oxide interfaces.

Honours and awards
 University Research Fellow, Royal Society (2011 election).
 The Brian Pippard Prize for Superconductivity 2010, Institute of Physics.

Selected works

References

External links 
Jason Robinson's home page at the University of Cambridge.

1980 births
Living people
Fellows of St John's College, Cambridge